Henry Parkinson (1899 – 22 January 1994) was an English professional football centre forward who played in the Football League for Brentford and Oldham Athletic.

Career statistics

References

1899 births
1994 deaths
English footballers
English Football League players
Brentford F.C. players
Association football forwards
Oldham Athletic A.F.C. players
Lytham F.C. players
People from Little Hulton
Altrincham F.C. players
Macclesfield Town F.C. players
Morecambe F.C. players